John Joseph Ryba Jr. (August 10, 1929January 9, 2021) was an American politician and public administrator.  A Democrat, he was a member of the Wisconsin State Assembly for 10 years (1993–2003), representing Green Bay.

Biography
Ryba was born on August 10, 1929, in Chicago, Illinois. He graduated from Thomas Kelly High School, in Chicago, and, in March 1951, was drafted into the United States Army for service in the Korean War.  After the war he remained in the United States Army Reserve.

Political career
Ryba was first elected to the Assembly in 1992. He was also a member of the Brown County Board of Supervisors and the Green Bay City Council from 1970 to 1993.

Personal life and family
John Ryba married Gertrude Styczynski on October 9, 1954.  They had three children together.  At the time of John's death, in 2021, he was survived by his wife, three children, seven grandchildren, and ten great grandchildren.

References

External links
 

1929 births
2021 deaths
Politicians from Chicago
Politicians from Green Bay, Wisconsin
Members of the Wisconsin State Assembly
County supervisors in Wisconsin
Wisconsin city council members
Military personnel from Illinois
Military personnel from Wisconsin
United States Army soldiers
United States Army personnel of the Korean War